Javier Paredes Arango (born 5 July 1982) is a Spanish former footballer who played mainly as a left back.

He started his career with Real Oviedo, and made his La Liga debut with Getafe in 2005. During a 14-year professional career he represented mainly Zaragoza, signing in 2007 and appearing in 172 competitive games.

Club career

Early years / Getafe
Paredes was born in Oviedo. After starting playing football at hometown Asturias club Real Oviedo and being relegated from the second division in the 2002–03 season, he left for two additional campaigns in Real Madrid's B-side, Real Madrid Castilla, who competed in the third level.

In 2005–06, Paredes joined Getafe CF also in the Madrid area, and made his official – and La Liga – debut on 28 August 2005, in a 2–0 away win against Real Sociedad. He appeared in only seven games that season, barred by first-choice Mariano Pernía, but would be the undisputed starter in the following after the Argentine left for Atlético Madrid.

Zaragoza
For 2007–08, Paredes signed with Aragon's Real Zaragoza, agreeing on a five-year deal. Initially backing up Juanfran, he finished as first-choice as the team eventually got relegated; he was again starter in the following campaign, helping to an immediate promotion back.

Pushed by new signing Ivan Obradović, Paredes featured in just 20 league matches in 2009–10, but was still the most utilized left-back as Zaragoza retained its top division status. In the summer he was deemed surplus to requirements by manager José Aurelio Gay, being limited to training. In early September 2010, during a training session, both got involved in a serious argument that nearly evolved to a physical confrontation; subsequently, the player was suspended by the club, being reinstated – and inserted in the starting XI – in November, as Gay was sacked and replaced by Javier Aguirre.

In the following years, Paredes featured more often than not as a central defender. Zaragoza returned to division two at the end of the 2012–13 season, and he was released on 25 February 2014 alongside José María Movilla, finding about the news through the club's website.

Albacete
In January 2015, after nearly one year without a club, Paredes signed for Albacete Balompié in the second tier.

References

External links

1982 births
Living people
Footballers from Oviedo
Spanish footballers
Association football defenders
La Liga players
Segunda División players
Segunda División B players
Real Oviedo Vetusta players
Real Oviedo players
Real Madrid Castilla footballers
Real Madrid CF players
Getafe CF footballers
Real Zaragoza players
Albacete Balompié players
CD Ebro players
Spain youth international footballers